Stalgėnai eldership is an eldership in the centre of Plungė District Municipality. The administrative center is Stalgėnai.

Largest villages 
Stalgėnai
Milašaičiai
Luknėnai

Other villages 
Kalniškiai
Lekemė
Rapšaičiai
Stalgas
Vainaičiai
Vitkai

References 

Elderships in Plungė District Municipality